The 1949 Nova Scotia general election was held on 9 June 1949 to elect members of the 44th House of Assembly of the Province of Nova Scotia, Canada. It was won by the Liberal party. The Progressive Conservatives returned to the legislature after their wipeout in the 1945 general election, but their eight seats put them in a distant second place to the Liberals' 37.

Results

Results by party

Retiring incumbents
Liberal
John Malcolm Campbell, Victoria
John Patrick Gorman, Antigonish
Gordon Purdy, Colchester
Henry A. Waterman, Yarmouth

Nominated candidates
Legend
bold denotes party leader
† denotes an incumbent who is not running for re-election or was defeated in nomination contest

Valley

|-
|bgcolor=whitesmoke|Annapolis
||
|Henry Hicks5,09152.29%
|
|Louisa Anna Shaw1982.03%
|
|Harry Thompson MacKenzie4,44745.68%
|
|
||
|Henry Hicks
|-
|bgcolor=whitesmoke|Clare
|
|Benoit Comeau2,07849.55%
|
|
||
|Desire J. Comeau2,11650.45%
|
|
||
|New riding
|-
|bgcolor=whitesmoke|Digby
|
|Blanchard Spring Morrell2,74849.26%
|
|
||
|E. Keith Potter2,83050.74%
|
|
||
|Vacant
|-
|bgcolor=whitesmoke|Hants West
|
|George B. Cole2,53039.67%
|
|Ralph Loomer5698.92%
|
|George Henry Wilson2,52939.66%
|
|Gordon B. Crossley74911.75%
||
|New riding
|-
|rowspan=2 bgcolor=whitesmoke|Kings
||
|David Durell Sutton7,32225.34%
|
|
|
|Hiram Thomas7,06124.44%
|
|
||
|David Durell Sutton
|-
||
|William H. Pipe7,36925.51%
|
|
|
|Edward Haliburton7,13824.71%
|
|
||
|New seat
|}

South Shore

|-
|rowspan=2 bgcolor=whitesmoke|Lunenburg
||
|Arthur L. Thurlow7,14523.49%
|
|Orris A. MacLaren8442.77%
|
|R. Clifford Levy6,93522.80%
|
|
||
|Vacant
|-
||
|Gordon E. Romkey7,81425.69%
|
|Lemuel O. Murphy8712.86%
|
|Fred Rhodenizer6,80722.38%
|
|
||
|Gordon E. Romkey
|-
|bgcolor=whitesmoke|Queens
||
|Merrill D. Rawding3,16650.21%
|
|J.N. McIntyre2994.74%
|
|E.M. More2,84045.04%
|
|
||
|Merrill D. Rawding
|-
|bgcolor=whitesmoke|Shelburne
||
|Wilfred Dauphinee3,43653.20%
|
|
|
|Reginald Donald Ross3,02346.80%
|
|
||
|Wilfred Dauphinee
|-
|rowspan=2 bgcolor=whitesmoke|Yarmouth 
|
|Joseph Israel Pothier4,60124.38%
|
|
||
|William Heartz Brown5,32228.20%
|
|
||
|New seat
|-
||
|Donald J. Fraser4,75125.18%
|
|
|
|Alfred B. d'Entremont4,19722.24%
|
|
||
|Henry A. Waterman†
|}

Fundy-Northeast

|-
|rowspan=2 bgcolor=whitesmoke|Colchester
|
|W.J. MacDonald6,96823.23%
|
|A.L. Lynds5131.71%
||
|Robert Stanfield8,08126.94%
|
|
||
|Gordon Purdy†
|-
|
|Robert F. McLellan6,85722.86%
|
|
||
|George Isaac Smith7,58025.27%
|
|
||
|Robert F. McLellan
|-
|bgcolor=whitesmoke|Cumberland Centre
||
|Archibald J. Mason2,21942.41%
|
|Florence Welton1,40626.87%
|
|Archie B. Smith1,60730.71%
|
|
||
|New riding
|-
|bgcolor=whitesmoke|Cumberland East
||
|Martin J. Kaufman4,28049.79%
|
|Brenton Garnhum6978.11%
|
|Arnold G. McLellan3,61942.10%
|
|
||
|Martin J. KaufmanCumberland
|-
|bgcolor=whitesmoke|Cumberland West
|
|Kenneth Judson Cochrane2,64548.38%
|
|
||
|Thomas A. Giles2,82251.62%
|
|
||
|Kenneth Judson CochraneCumberland
|-
|bgcolor=whitesmoke|Hants East
|
|Robert A. MacLellan2,06946.62%
|
|Johnston B. Hart2726.13%
||
|Ernest M. Ettinger2,09747.25%
|
|
||
|Robert A. MacLellanHants
|}

Halifax/Dartmouth/Eastern Shore

|-
|bgcolor=whitesmoke|Halifax Centre
||
|James Edward Rutledge5,72554.71%
|
|Elmore Webber1,16711.15%
|
|Jack L. Dowell3,57334.14%
|
|
||
|James Edward Rutledge
|-
|bgcolor=whitesmoke|Halifax East
||
|Geoffrey W. Stevens7,70352.22%
|
|Wallace Mason2,77318.80%
|
|R. Graham Murray4,27428.98%
|
|
||
|Geoffrey W. Stevens
|-
|bgcolor=whitesmoke|Halifax North
||
|Harold Connolly7,94454.79%
|
|Arthur Kenneth Green2,06614.25%
|
|Richard Donahoe4,48930.96%
|
|
||
|Harold Connolly
|-
|bgcolor=whitesmoke|Halifax South
||
|Angus Lewis Macdonald6,09759.57%
|
|Edward Coombs9269.05%
|
|John R. Milledge3,21231.38%
|
|
||
|Angus Lewis Macdonald
|-
|bgcolor=whitesmoke|Halifax West
||
|Ronald Manning Fielding6,78849.88%
|
|Fred M. Young3,02722.24%
|
|Malcolm Edgbert Walker3,79527.88%
|
|
||
|Ronald Manning Fielding
|}

Central Nova

|-
|bgcolor=whitesmoke|Antigonish 
||
|Colin H. Chisholm3,17958.23%
|
|
|
|Terrance Bernard Thompson2,28041.77%
|
|
||
|John Patrick Gorman†
|-
|bgcolor=whitesmoke|Guysborough
||
|Arthur W. MacKenzie4,04164.19%
|
|
|
|Hugh A.K. Forbes2,25435.81%
|
|
||
|Arthur W. MacKenzie
|-
|bgcolor=whitesmoke|Pictou Centre
||
|Alfred B. DeWolfe5,28347.49%
|
|Alvin M. Stewart1,34312.07%
|
|John A. MacGregor4,49940.44%
|
|
||
|Alfred B. DeWolfePictou
|-
|bgcolor=whitesmoke|Pictou East
||
|John W. MacDonald2,45546.55%
|
|Collie G. Ross60311.43%
|
|William A. MacLeod2,21642.02%
|
|
||
|VacantPictou
|-
|bgcolor=whitesmoke|Pictou West
||
|Stewart W. Proudfoot2,81755.04%
|
|
|
|Donald R. Gilchrist2,30144.96%
|
|
||
|New riding
|}

Cape Breton

|-
|bgcolor=whitesmoke|Cape Breton Centre
|
|Ronald McIsaac3,27140.17%
||
|Michael James MacDonald3,33941.01%
|
|Joseph A. MacDonald1,53218.82%
|
|
||
|Michael James MacDonald
|-
|bgcolor=whitesmoke|Cape Breton East
|
|Charles Roy MacDonald3,82936.59%
||
|Russell Cunningham4,54343.41%
|
|Thomas Horace Dickson2,09320.00%
|
|
||
|Russell Cunningham
|-
|bgcolor=whitesmoke|Cape Breton North
||
|Alexander O'Handley4,72746.13%
|
|Wendell Coldwell2,50224.42%
|
|John Michael Macdonald3,01829.45%
|
|
||
|Alexander O'Handley
|-
|bgcolor=whitesmoke|Cape Breton South
||
|John Smith MacIvor6,74247.20%
|
|Vincent Allan Morrison3,74026.18%
|
|Ross Anderson MacKimmie3,80226.62%
|
|
||
|John Smith MacIvor
|-
|bgcolor=whitesmoke|Cape Breton West
||
|Malcolm A. Patterson3,44451.14%
|
|Arthur Briggs1,17117.39%
|
|David McLeod2,12031.48%
|
|
||
|Malcolm A. Patterson
|-
|rowspan=2 bgcolor=whitesmoke|Inverness
||
|Alexander H. McKinnon6,16837.72%
|
|
|
|Alcorn A. Munro2,36814.48%
|
|
||
|Alexander H. McKinnon
|-
||
|Roderick MacLean5,56234.01%
|
|
|
|George H. Penny2,25413.78%
|
|
||
|New seat
|-
|bgcolor=whitesmoke|Richmond
||
|Lauchlin Daniel Currie3,25466.49%
|
|
|
|D.W. Morrison1,64033.51%
|
|
||
|Lauchlin Daniel Currie
|-
|bgcolor=whitesmoke|Victoria
||
|Carleton L. MacMillan2,48661.75%
|
|
|
|Phillip MacLeod1,54038.25%
|
|
||
|John Malcolm Campbell†
|}

References

1949
Nova Scotia general election
General election
Nova Scotia general election